Typhinellus amoenus is a species of sea snail, a marine gastropod mollusk in the family Muricidae, the murex snails or rock snails.

Description

Distribution
It is commonly found off the coast of Somalia.

References

Endemic fauna of Somalia
Typhinellus
Gastropods described in 1994